The Country Land and Business Association (CLA)  is a membership organisation for owners of land, property and businesses in rural England and Wales. It was until quite recently called the Country Landowners' Association.

Membership
CLA members own or manage 10 million acres, over 50% of the rural land in England and Wales. Its 30,000-strong membership includes landowners, farmers and rural businesses.

Function
The CLA states that it "is the only organisation dedicated to defending your interests as a landowner and is your only truly independent and authoritative source of advice." It offers members a support and advice network through a free in-house policy, legal, and tax advisory service, as well as offering networking opportunities for landowners and rural businesses.

The CLA lobbies to protect its members' interests in relation to rural issues at local, national and EU levels.

Activities
The Policy team, based in the London office, offers advice on tax and legal, environment and conservation, agriculture and land management, as well as planning, housing and heritage. This includes issues such as the right to roam, reform of the EU Common Agricultural Policy, heritage, rural housing, renewable energy and taxation.

Six regional offices include teams of rural surveyors and advisers for local branch members.

The CLA publishes the monthly Land and Business magazine. This is available to all members as a part of their membership subscription.

History
The CLA was founded in 1907 after a pamphlet called "The Land and the Social Problem" was published by Algernon Tumor, a high-ranking civil servant and former private secretary to Benjamin Disraeli, advocating the co-operation of owners, tenants and workers in the countryside for their common interests.

The organisation celebrated its centenary in 2007. Journalist Charles Clover wrote The History of the CLA to celebrate the anniversary.

Structure
The CLA is governed by a Council structure reflecting the breadth of the CLA's work. Council works to guide the organisation through shaping policy development and inspiring support within the membership.

There is a small board of directors that is responsible for the running of the CLA and for making sure that the organisation works as well as possible to deliver its core purposes.

There is a main corporate office based in London and also six regional offices:

 Midlands 
 East 
 South East 
 South West 
 Wales 
 North

CLA Game Fair

The CLA no longer runs the CLA Game Fair. It announced in September 2015 that it "could no longer ask CLA members to allow their membership subscriptions to underwrite the losses the event makes."

See also
 National Farmers Union (England and Wales)
 Historic Houses Association
 European Landowners' Organisation
 Farmers' Union of Wales

References

External links
Official website of the CLA
Flooding in Lincolnshire in July 2007
Livestock in July 2004
Postcards in February 2002

1907 establishments in the United Kingdom
Agricultural organisations based in the United Kingdom
Landowners' organizations
Organizations established in 1907
Business organisations based in the United Kingdom